The Presbyterian College of Education, Akropong, is a co-educational teacher-training college in Akropong in the Akwapim district of the Eastern Region of Ghana. It has gone through a series of previous names, including the Presbyterian Training College, the Scottish Mission Teacher Training College, and the Basel Mission Seminary. The college is affiliated to the University of Education, Winneba.

History 
The first institution of higher education in Ghana, it was founded by the Basel Mission as the Basel Mission Seminary on 3 July 1848 and fondly referred to as the ‘Mother of Our Schools’. The college was the first institution of higher learning to be established to train teacher-catechists for the eventual Presbyterian Church of the Gold Coast. The college is the second oldest higher educational institution in early modern West Africa after Sierra Leone’s Fourah Bay College, founded in 1827. For more than 50 years, it remained the only teacher training institution in the then Gold Coast. It is affiliated to the Presbyterian Church of Ghana. The idea to establish the college was motivated by the ideals of 18th century Württemberg Pietism inspired by German theologians Philipp Spener and August Hermann Francke. The Basel Missionaries who originated mainly from Switzerland and Germany established the college. In the course of the one hundred and sixty years of its existence, the college has run different academic programmes and different curricula have been followed, all tailored to suit the demands of the various times.

These ideals emphasised a combination of spirituality with transformation of life through the practicality of Christian teachings. This feature distinguished the Basel Mission from Anglican and Methodist missionary societies such as the Church Missionary Society, the Society for the Propagation of the Gospel and the Wesleyan Methodist Mission Society which were more doctrinal in their approach to evangelism.

Starting with an enrollment figure of 5 students in 1848, the college now has a student population of 1,268. The Presbyterian College of Education launched its 160th Anniversary in July 2008. The college has the tradition of celebrating renowned achievements on milestone occasions: Thousands of highly skilled and exceptionally disciplined educationists have passed out of the college, and have contributed immensely to the development of Ghana not only as teachers, but also as economists, politicians, lawyers, bankers, industrialists, journalists and clergymen. The college contributed to the staffing of the University of Ghana when it was established in 1948. Over eighty percent of the Moderators of the Presbyterian Church of Ghana and the Evangelical Presbyterian Church (including the present E.P. Moderator) were trained at P.T.C.

The first principal of the college was the Basel missionary, the Rev. Johannes Christian Dieterle. A similar teacher-catechist seminary at Christiansborg, started by the German missionary and philologist, Johannes Zimmermann in 1852, was eventually merged into the Akropong college years later in 1856 to become a single entity. In 1864, the Basel missionary and builder, Fritz Ramseyer, who became a captive of the Asante between 1869 and 1874 and pioneered mission work in the Ashanti territories, arrived on the Gold Coast for the first time to assist the mission in its structural work, completing the construction of the seminary buildings at Akropong.

According to the British historian of missions, Andrew Walls, the catechist-teacher education model adopted by the Basel Mission, was an innovation of the Church Missionary Society pioneered by the Anglican vicar, Henry Venn "as a sort of lower, unordained missionary" - "a subaltern role to facilitate the spread of the Gospel."  The original curriculum included a five-year course in the methods in pedagogy, education, theology and Christian catechism. In popular culture, the school is dubbed, the Mother of our Schools. It was the only teacher-training college on the Gold Coast for more than half-a-century producing educators for the needs of the community and the Presbyterian Church. The college now offers diplomas and degrees in education, pedagogy and related subjects. The college participated in the DFID-funded Transforming Teacher Education and Learning programme, Ghana (T-TEL) programme. It is one of the about 40 public colleges of education in Ghana.

Today 

It is now a fully-fledged public institution with the Ghana Education Service system under the auspices of the Government of Ghana. Initially, the plan was to upgrade the college to a university but that idea was abandoned after the church founded the Presbyterian University College in 1998.

The curriculum now includes general education requirements tailored to the demands of a developing country. The school was established five years after the Basel Mission started the country's first primary school in 1843. The Basel Mission, and later the Presbyterian Church of Ghana also led pioneering efforts in establishing hundreds of primary and secondary schools and teacher-training colleges.

Education 
The college started with a five-year teacher's certificate course and later run programmes which included the Cert ‘A’ 4-year course, 2-year Cert ‘B’ the 2-year Post ‘B’, 2-year Post-Secondary, 3-year Post Secondary and 2-year Specialist course in Science, Agriculture and Special Education, The college runs a three-year Diploma in Basic Education programme which started in 2004. It is among the fifteen Science designated colleges in the country.

The Presbyterian College of Education has several programmes

Programmes offered 
 Vocational & Technical Skills
 Languages
 Science
 Education Studies
 Mathematics & ICT
 Social Sciences
 Communication skills

List of Principals

Notable faculty and staff 
Ephraim Amu - Ghanaian musicologist, composer and teacher; instructor in music and agriculture
David Asante - first native Akan missionary of the Basel mission and philologist; instructor in language
E. A. Boateng - first Vice-Chancellor of the University of Cape Coast; instructor in geography 
 Johann Gottlieb Christaller - German missionary and philologist; instructor in language
 Alexander Worthy Clerk - Jamaican Moravian missionary and teacher; instructor in Biblical studies
Joseph Hanson Kwabena Nketia - Ghanaian composer and ethnomusicologist; instructor in music
Fritz Ramseyer - Swiss missionary and builder; mission technical staff
 Carl Christian Reindorf - Gold Coast historian and Basel Mission pastor; instructor in history
Johannes Zimmermann - German missionary and philologist; instructor in language

Notable alumni 

 Gottlieb Ababio Adom - Gold Coast educator, journalist, editor and Presbyterian minister
 Kwasi Sintim Aboagye - Ghanaian politician, member of parliament during the first republic.
 Clement Anderson Akrofi - Gold Coast ethnolinguist, translator and philologist who worked extensively on the structure of the Twi language 
Ofori Atta I - Okyenhene or King of Akyem Abuakwa, 1912  – 1943
Rose Akua Ampofo - Ghanaian educator, gender advocate and first woman in Ghana to be ordained a Presbyterian minister
 Michael Paul Ansah - Ghanaian politician, minister of state in the third republic
 David Asante - first native missionary of the Basel Mission and philologist; instructor in language 
 Christian Gonçalves Kwami Baëta  - Gold Coast academic and Presbyterian minister and Synod Clerk, Evangelical Presbyterian Church of the Gold Coast, 1945 – 1949, who was instrumental in the establishment of the University of Ghana, Legon in 1948
 Solomon Antwi Kwaku Bonsu - Ghanaian politician, minister of state in the first republic
 Carl Henry Clerk - Gold Coast educator, administrator, journalist, editor and Presbyterian minister, fourth Synod Clerk, Presbyterian Church of the Gold Coast, 1950 – 1954
 Nicholas T. Clerk - Ghanaian academic, administrator and Presbyterian minister
 Nicholas Timothy Clerk - Gold Coast-born Basel missionary and theologian, first Synod Clerk, Presbyterian Church of the Gold Coast, 1918 –1932
 Ferdinand Koblavi Dra Goka - Ghanaian educationist and politician in the First Republic; Volta Regional Minister, 1960 – 1961 and Minister for Finance, 1961 – 1964
Peter Hall - Gold Coast-born Jamaican educator, clergyman, missionary and first Moderator of the Presbyterian Church of the Gold Coast, 1918 –1922
Emmanuel Mate Kole - Konor, or paramount chief of the Manya Krobo, 1892–1939.
Joseph Edward Michel - one of the early commissioned officers in the Ghana Army, Michel Camp was named in his honour.
Joseph Hanson Kwabena Nketia - Ghanaian composer and ethnomusicologist; 
Richard Emmanuel Obeng (1877–1951), Ghanaian writer; credited for writing one of Africa's earliest and Ghana's first novel titled Eighteenpence.
 Nii Amaa Ollennu - jurist, judge, Justice of the Supreme Court of Ghana, Speaker of the Parliament of Ghana in the Second Republic and acting President of Ghana from 7 August 1970 to 31 August 1970
 Theophilus Opoku - native Akan linguist, translator, philologist, educator and missionary who became the first indigenous African to be ordained a pastor on Gold Coast soil by the Basel Mission in 1872
 Solomon Osei-Akoto - Ghanaian educationist and politician in the Second Republic, Deputy Minister for Transport and Communications, 1969 – 1972
 Emmanuel Charles Quist - barrister, judge and the first African President of the Legislative Council and first Speaker of the Parliament of Ghana 
 Edward Akufo-Addo-politician and judge; former Chief Justice in the NLC era and President of Ghana in the second Republic

See also 

 Akrofi-Christaller Institute
 Education in Ghana
 Presbyterian Women's College of Education
 Salem School, Osu
 Trinity Theological Seminary, Legon

References

External links 

 Presbyterian College of Education Website 

Christian schools in Ghana
Colleges of Education in Ghana
Education in Ghana
Educational institutions established in 1848
Presbyterian schools in Africa
Presbyterian universities and colleges
Education in the Eastern Region (Ghana)
Presbyterian College of Education, Akropong alumni
Presbyterian College of Education, Akropong
1848 establishments in Africa